La fête des masques is a book by Togolese author Sami Tchak. It won the Grand prix littéraire d'Afrique noire in 2004.

References

Togolese literature
Grand prix littéraire d'Afrique noire winners
2004 books